The New Balance Games was an annual indoor track and field meet which was held in late January at the Fort Washington Avenue Armory. It was first held in Manhattan, a neighbourhood in New York City.

The competition is part of National Federation of State High School Associations's New Balance Nationals Indoor and attracts high caliber athletes, including Olympic and World medalists.

After New Balance moved to Boston and the Armory was rebranded with Nike,  the meet was renamed to the U.S. Army Officials Hall of Fame Invitational in 2023.

References

External links
Official website

Annual indoor track and field meetings
Track and field competitions in the United States
Sports in New York City
Annual sporting events in the United States
Track and field in New York City